Kanduleh Rural District is a rural district (dehestan) in Dinavar District, Sahneh County, Kermanshah Province, Iran. At the 2006 census, its population was 5,080, in 1,296 families. The rural district has 26 villages.

References 

Rural Districts of Kermanshah Province
Sahneh County